Asterope may refer to:

 Asterope (Greek mythology)
 Asterope (butterfly), a butterfly genus
 Asterope, the IAU-approved proper name of the star 21 Tauri
 233 Asterope, a main-belt asteroid
 AsteRope, a pair of parallel circumferential tethers circling an asteroid to enable improved extra-vehicular activity